The Arab American News is a weekly bilingual newspaper representing Arab Americans published in Dearborn, Michigan, USA in Greater Detroit. It began publishing on 7 September 1984 and its publisher is Lebanese-born Osama Siblani.   It is believed to be the oldest and largest Arab American newspaper.

In 2014, The Arab American News was one of the ethnic media outlets featured in an exhibit called “One Nation With News for All”  at the Newseum in Washington, D.C.

Osama Sibliani
Siblani was inducted into the Michigan Journalism Hall of Fame in April 2013. He is the first to be inducted from an ethnic media outlet, and the second Arab American, after the induction of the late Helen Thomas in 1993.

Siblani is also the recipient of the “Spirit of Diversity in Journalism” award from Wayne State University, during the 10th Annual Helen Thomas Awards on April 16, 2010.

See also

 History of the Middle Eastern people in Metro Detroit
 Arabic-language newspapers published in the United States

References

External links 
 The Arab American News

Newspapers published in Michigan
Arabic-language newspapers published in the United States
Arab-American culture in Michigan
Publications established in 1984
1984 establishments in Michigan
Bilingual newspapers
Non-English-language newspapers published in Michigan
Arab and Islamic culture in Dearborn, Michigan